Reem Taoz, known professionally as GATTÜSO, is an Israeli disc jockey (DJ), and EDM musician from Tel Aviv who is active in New York City.  He has appeared on the Billboard Dance Radio chart three times, and has over 2 million monthly listeners on Spotify.

Career
Taoz's first official release was in 2018 with the song "Who We Are." In 2019, he signed an exclusive record contract with Ultra Music.  In March 2020, GATTÜSO and R3hab released a cover of Radiohead's "Creep" which was featured as the first of Spotify's 'Mint Singles' series.  The track went on to be featured in 40 New Music Fridays around the world and received 10 million plays in its first month.  In August 2020, he released "Cruel" which received heavy rotation on Fun Radio France.

In 2019, Taoz wrote and dedicated a song to the former Italian football player and AC Milan manager Gennaro Gattuso.  The song titled “Scusa Gattuso” became a viral sensation and charted in Italy.

In 2021, GATTÜSO released "Leave the World Behind" in collaboration with DVBBS.  The song debuted on over 30 Spotify New Music Fridays across the world.  In summer of 2021, GATTÜSO teamed up with Steve Aoki and Aukoustics to reimagine the R.E.M. song "Losing My Religion." Aoki Later joined him (alongside artist Cash Cash) on several dates of his Push The Reds tour later that summer.

In 2022, GATTÜSO collaborated with Dutch DJ Nicky Romero on their track "Afterglow" which released on Romero's label Protocol Recordings.  In the same year, GATTÜSO performed on the main stages of Escapade Music Festival, Chasing Summer Festival, and Electric Zoo.

Discography

References 

21st-century American musicians
Club DJs
Jewish American musicians
Musicians from New York City
Year of birth missing (living people)
Living people
21st-century American Jews